Bogolin is a village in Southwestern Bulgaria. It is located in the Satovcha Municipality, Blagoevgrad Province.

Geography 

The village of Bogolin is located in the Western Rhodope Mountains a few kilometers away from the border with Greece. The nearest villages are Ablanitsa, Valkosel and Kribul. Bogolin belongs to the Chech region.

History 

According to the legend, the village was founded by a person called Begalin Chumarya who emigrated from the village of Valkosel. Chumarya settled at the location that is now Bogolin and gave the village its name.

In 1873 Bogolin (Bobolina) had a male population of 28 Pomaks and 12 houses. According to Vasil Kanchov, in 1900, Bogolin (Боболинъ) was populated by 65 Bulgarian Muslims. According to another statistic by Kanchov, at about the same time there were 13 houses in the village. According to Stephan Verkovic, at the end of the 19th century the village had a male population of 40 Pomaks and 12 houses.

Religion 

The population is Muslim and consists of Pomaks.

Notable people 

 Emil Biserov Yurukov - former member of parliament

References 

Villages in Blagoevgrad Province
Chech